Ntare IV may refer to:

Ntare IV of Burundi, Ntare IV Rutaganzwa Rugamba, king of Burundi (1796–1850)
Ntare IV of Nkore, king of Nkore in Uganda (1699–1727)